The BPM Festival is an annual electronic music festival, held in Portimão, Portugal.

History
The BPM Festival is an annual ten day and night electronic music festival, founded by Craig Pettigrew the genius, held in Playa Del Carmen, Mexico. BPM, which stands for “Bartenders, Promoters, Musicians” was created in 2008 as a post-New Year's gathering of industry professionals and has grown to a 70,000+ global gathering of DJs, producers, revelers and industry professionals featuring over 400 DJs and 80+ events. BPM parties are hosted both day and night at multiple venues in Playa Del Carmen, a picturesque beach town that runs along miles of soft white sand beaches and sparkling turquoise waters on the Mayan Riviera. The program is split into day and night showcases hosted by different record labels and promoters, across various venues in Playa del Carmen, including beachclubs, nightclubs and even an underground restaurant  including DIYNAMIC, elrow, ENTER., Innervisions, Life and Death, Paradise, SCI+TEC and many more. Playa del Carmen offers a variety of affordable boutique hotels and condos, and options for dining and tourism, including ancient Mayan ruins, cenotes, aquatic sports and ecotourism.

In 2013, The BPM Festival won the "International Festival" award from DJ Awards in Ibiza and in 2016 was nominated by International Dance Music Awards for "Best Music Event" for a third year in a row, as well as “Festival of the Year” at the first ever Electronic Music Awards & Foundation. In addition, The BPM Festival won "Best Festival" in the EMPO Awards in 2015 with a nomination in 2016. Now embarking on its tenth year, The BPM Festival continues to be a dance music lover's tropical paradise and the perfect winter getaway.

Approximately 35,000 people attended The BPM Festival in 2012 which has grown to over 70,000 from 72 countries. Artists on the 2013 schedule include Richie Hawtin, Sasha, Jamie Jones, Damian Lazarus, Carl Cox, Maceo Plex, Soul Clap, Wolf + Lamb, Lee Burridge, Jamie Roy, Loco Dice and Luciano.
|
The 10th edition was held in January 2017, with its line-up featuring Carl Cox, Cassy, Dubfire, Erick Morillo, Guy Gerber, John Digweed, Lee Curtiss, Lee Foss, Marco Carola, Nicole Moudaber, Pete Tong, Seth Troxler, Skream, Solomun, Soul Clap, The Martinez Brothers, and Wolf + Lamb.

2017 shooting, move to Portugal 
On 16 January 2017, four people were killed and fifteen were wounded by a "lone shooter" during a closing event for the festival at the Blue Parrot nightclub where Seth Troxler was playing. A woman also died in a stampede that ensued as a result of the gunfire. Organizers identified three of the victims killed as being part of the festival's security staff. An image of a narcomanta claiming responsibility for the attack, left by the drug cartel Los Zetas, circulated following the shootings. The message contained specific references to BPM and Philip Pulitano, stated that they "didn't get in line", and also contained threats against rival gangs. While authorities had not yet connected the shootings to Los Zetas, a person familiar with the matter told CBC News that the attack might have been the result of non-compliance with the gang's demands. Following the shooting, it was reported that the organizers had gone into hiding.

On 16 January 2017, Mayor Cristina Torres Gómez stated in El Universal that the city's stance was to no longer allow BPM's organizers to hold events there.  Maria Helena Mata Pineda, president of Riviera Maya's Business Coordinating Council, called for a ban of all electronic music events in the region, stating that "We don't want BPM here anymore, or any other similar event. We don't want it and we thank the authorities who are listening." On 24 January 2017, organizers released their first official statement regarding the shooting, reporting that 14 of the 15 attendees wounded had been released from hospital. The organizers also stated that news reports attributing the shooting to cartel activity were "based on speculation and misinformation from unidentified sources".

During one of its shows, organizers had announced that the 2017 edition would be the final edition held in Mexico, as they were considering moving the festival to Brazil or Portugal. In April 2017, it was announced that the event would be held at Praia da Rocha, Portugal for the first time in September 2017.

2018 Festival 

The 2018 edition of the festival took place 20th - 23rd September 2018, in Portimao. With artists including: Craig Richards, Joseph Capriati, Octave One, Patrick Topping and more performing at the festival

2019 Festival 

The 2019 edition took place across 12-15th September, in Portimao. With Laurent Garnier, Paco Osuna, Loco Dice, Stefan Bodzin all in performing.

See also

List of electronic music festivals

References

External links

Music festivals established in 2008
Electronic music festivals in Mexico
Festivals in Playa del Carmen